Tripoli is a city in Bremer County, Iowa, United States. The population was 1,191 at the time of the 2020 census. It is part of the Waterloo–Cedar Falls Metropolitan Statistical Area.

Geography
Tripoli is located at  (42.805736, -92.257580).

Climate

According to the Köppen Climate Classification system, Tripoli has a hot-summer humid continental climate, abbreviated "Dfa" on climate maps.

Demographics

2010 census

As of the census of 2010, there were 1,313 people, 540 households, and 356 families living in the city. The racial makeup of the city was 98.2% White, 0.2% African American, 0.3% Asian, 0.5% from other races, and 0.8% from two or more races. Hispanic or Latino of any race were 1.1% of the population.

There were 540 households, of which 33.3% had children under the age of 18 living with them, 51.1% were married couples living together, 10.7% had a female householder with no husband present, 4.1% had a male householder with no wife present, and 34.1% were non-families. Of all households 31.3% were made up of individuals, and 14.4% had someone living alone who was 65 years of age or older. The average household size was 2.37 and the average family size was 2.95.

The median age in the city was 40.5 years. 26% of residents were under the age of 18; 6.8% were between the ages of 18 and 24; 22.8% were from 25 to 44; 25.1% were from 45 to 64; and 19.3% were 65 years of age or older. The gender makeup of the city was 47.0% male and 53.0% female.

2000 census
As of the census of 2000, there were 1,310 people, 537 households, and 361 families living in the city. The racial makeup of the city was 98.78% White, 0.15% African American, 0.08% Native American, 0.08% Asian, 0.08% from other races, and 0.84% from two or more races. Hispanic or Latino of any race were 0.23% of the population.

There were 537 households, out of which 31.5% had children under the age of 18 living with them, 53.6% were married couples living together, 8.6% had a female householder with no husband present, and 32.6% were non-families. Of all households 30.5% were made up of individuals, and 17.1% had someone living alone who was 65 years of age or older. The average household size was 2.38 and the average family size was 2.96.

27.1% were under the age of 18, 6.5% from 18 to 24, 25.6% from 25 to 44, 20.5% from 45 to 64, and 20.3% were 65 years of age or older. The median age was 39 years. For every 100 females, there were 90.7 males. For every 100 females age 18 and over, there were 84.0 males.

The median income for a household in the city was $34,444, and the median income for a family was $42,647. Males had a median income of $30,764 versus $22,353 for females. The per capita income for the city was $16,882. About 7.3% of families and 9.6% of the population were below the poverty line, including 13.6% of those under age 18 and 13.2% of those age 65 or over.

Education
The Tripoli Community School District operates local public schools.

References

Cities in Bremer County, Iowa
Cities in Iowa
Waterloo – Cedar Falls metropolitan area